Thach is a surname. Notable people with the surname include:

John Thach (1905–1981), American World War II Naval Aviator, air combat tactician, and United States Navy admiral
Robert Thach (1866–1924), American golfer